American boy band NSYNC has released four studio albums and 18 singles. The band first charted in 1996 and released their self-titled debut album in 1997. Their debut studio album 'N SYNC (1997) was preceded by the lead single "I Want You Back", which entered the top five in New Zealand and the United Kingdom, and the top 20 in the United States. Supported by the commercial success of its lead single "Bye Bye Bye", their third studio album No Strings Attached (2000) debuted with 2.4 million copies sold in the first week. The second single, "It's Gonna Be Me", reached number one on the US Billboard Hot 100. Their first two studio albums were certified Diamond by the Recording Industry Association of America. Celebrity, their fourth and last studio album, was released in 2001 and the final single ”Girlfriend” in 2002.

Albums

Studio albums

Compilation albums

Singles

As lead artist
{| class="wikitable plainrowheaders" style="text-align:center;"
|+List of singles as lead artist, with selected chart positions and certifications, showing year released and album name
! scope="col" rowspan="2" style="width:25em;" | Title
! rowspan="2"| Year
! colspan="10"| Peak chart positions
! scope="col" rowspan="2" style="width:12em;" | Certifications
! scope="col" rowspan="2" style="width:12em;" | Album
|-
! style="width:2.5em;font-size:90%"| US
! style="width:2.5em;font-size:90%"| US AC
! style="width:2.5em;font-size:90%"| US Pop
! style="width:2.5em;font-size:90%"| US Dance
! style="width:2.5em;font-size:90%"| AUS
! style="width:2.5em;font-size:90%"| CAN
! style="width:2.5em;font-size:90%"| GER
! style="width:2.5em;font-size:90%"| NLD
! style="width:2.5em;font-size:90%"| NZ
! style="width:2.5em;font-size:90%"| UK
|-
! scope="row"| "I Want You Back"
| 1996
| 13 || — || 7 || 17 || 11 || 6 || 10 || 22 || 5 || 5
|
RIAA: Gold
ARIA: Gold
BPI: Silver
| rowspan="5"| N Sync|-
! scope="row"| "Tearin' Up My Heart"
| rowspan="4"| 1997
| 59 || — || 6 || — || 20 || 3 || 4 || 31 || 19 || 9
|
BPI: Silver
|-
! scope="row"| "Here We Go"
| — || — || — || — || — || — || 8 || 66 || — || —
|
|-
! scope="row"| "For the Girl Who Has Everything"
| — || — || — || — || — || — || 32 || — || — || —
|
|-
! scope="row"| "Together Again"
| — || — || — || — || — || — || 31 || — || — || —
|
|-
! scope="row"| "U Drive Me Crazy"
| rowspan="3"| 1998
| — || — || — || — || — || — || 30 || — || — || —
|
| The Winter Album|-
! scope="row"| "(God Must Have Spent) A Little More Time on You"
| 8 || 2 || 5 || — || 46 || 9 || — || — || — || —
|
| '''N Sync
|-
! scope="row"| "Merry Christmas, Happy Holidays"
| — || — || 37 || — || — || — || 57 || — || — || —
|
| Home for Christmas and The Winter Album
|-
! scope="row"| "Thinking of You (I Drive Myself Crazy)"
| rowspan="2"| 1999
| 67 || — || 14 || — || — || 16 || 71 || 15 || — || —
|
| N Sync and The Winter Album|-
! scope="row"| "Music of My Heart" (with Gloria Estefan)
| 2 || 2 || 21 || — || — || 30 || — || 58 || — || 34
|
RIAA: Gold
| Music of the Heart|-
! scope="row"| "Bye Bye Bye"
| rowspan="4"| 2000
| 4
| 25
| 1
| —
| 1
| 1
| 4
| 4
| 1
| 3
|
ARIA: Platinum
BPI: Gold
| align="center" rowspan="4"| No Strings Attached|-
! scope="row"| "It's Gonna Be Me"
| 1
| —
| 1
| 33
| 11
| 1
| 39
| 30
| 7
| 9
|
RIAA: Gold
ARIA: Platinum
BPI: Silver
|-
! scope="row"| "I'll Never Stop"
| —
| —
| —
| —
| —
| —
| 23
| 28
| —
| 13
|
|-
! scope="row"| "This I Promise You"
| 5
| 1
| 4
| 38
| 42
| 8
| 56
| 80
| 32
| 21
|
|-
! scope="row"| "Pop"
| rowspan="2"| 2001
| 19
| —
| 5
| 40
| 10
| 1
| 30
| 32
| 19
| 9
|
ARIA: Gold
| align="center" rowspan="3"| Celebrity|-
! scope="row"| "Gone"
| 11
| 27
| 7
| —
| 67
| 28
| 62
| —
| —
| 24
|
|-
! scope="row"| "Girlfriend" (featuring Nelly)
| 2002
| 5
| —
| 5
| —
| 2
| 1
| 6
| 8
| 13
| 2
|
ARIA: Gold
BPI: Gold
|-
| colspan="20" style="font-size:8pt"| "—" denotes releases that did not chart or were not released in that country.
|}

Guest singles

Soundtracks

Video albums

Biographies
 Never Enough (April 2000) – Unofficial biography of the band.
 NSYNC: Insane (September 2000) – Unofficial biography of the band.
 The Reel NSYNC (October 2002) – Documentary filmed by Joey featuring footage of the band backstage and on the road.
 The Ultimate Party (July 2003) – Unofficial documentary charting the history of the group.

Promotional
 No Strings Attached (November 1999) – Contains a behind the scenes look at the making of the album.
 Bye Bye Bye (September 2000) – Single containing the video for "Bye, Bye, Bye".
 Your Number #1 Video Requests & More'' (April 2000) – Includes the video for "Bye, Bye, Bye", a live performance of "This I Promise You" and exclusive behind-the-scenes footage.

Music videos

 "For the Girl Who Has Everything" and "Thinking of You (I Drive Myself Crazy)" were released also with different audio in Europe, "This I Promise You" and "Gone" have Spanish video versions and "Girlfriend" was also released with the Neptunes Remix.

Notes

References

 Phares, Heather. "Pokémon: the First Movie" and Credits. Album Review/Overview. AllMusic by Rovi. Rovi Corp, 2012. 13 November 2012.

See also
 List of artists who reached number one in the United States

Discographies of American artists
Pop music group discographies
Discography